Dauwhe is an album by American jazz clarinetist John Carter recorded in 1982 for the Italian Black Saint label.

Reception
The Allmusic review by Scott Yanow awarded the album 4½ stars, stating "The first of clarinetist John Carter's five-part series in which he musically depicts the history of black Americans is one of the strongest... Highly recommended for open-eared listeners".

Track listing
All compositions by John Carter
 "Dauwhe" - 12:07 
 "Ode to the Flower Maiden" - 7:52 
 "Enter from the East" - 7:57 
 "Soft Dance" - 6:18 
 "The Mating Ritual" - 7:04

Personnel
John Carter - clarinet
Bobby Bradford - cornet
James Newton - flute
Charles Owens - soprano saxophone, oboe, clarinet
Red Callender - tuba
Roberto Miranda - bass
William Jeffrey - drums
Luis Peralta - waterphone, percussion

References

Black Saint/Soul Note albums
1982 albums
John Carter (jazz musician) albums